Michael Kasajja is a Ugandan actor, model, choreographer and dancer. He debuted as a lead actor in the 2015 film Bala Bala Sese alongside his erstwhile girlfriend Natasha Sinayobye.

Early life and education 
Kasajja was raised in Kampala Uganda and went school at Busoga College Mwiri and at Caltec Academy. At Makerere University, he juggled a business administration degree with choreography for inter-hall competitions and variety shows.

Career 
Steve Jean continuously hired Kasajja after school to be his king dancer, an exposure that landed him to Pamela Basasirwaki, whom he started dating. As a member of The Obsessions Dance Group,  Pamela introduced him to the group and he was taken on instantly. Then along came another dancer with the group, Natasha Sinayobye that saw Pamela no more in the picture but the two quit the group in 2005 starting their own dance group the KOMBAT Entertainment Ltd. Under Kombat, He achieved her major performance highlight performing at the opening ceremony for the CHOGM 52 heads of states conference in Uganda 2007.
Michael recently landed himself a job as manager of the Ebonies drama group in plays Trials and Tribulations of Love, the ninth episode of the group's Romantic Night series. He was also one of the judges of NTV's Talent Xp alongside musicians, Isiah Katumwa, Jackie Chandiru and Bebe Cool.

Personal life 
Kasajja has a son named Sean Mario.

References

External links 
 

Ugandan male stage actors
Ugandan male film actors
Living people
Year of birth missing (living people)
21st-century Ugandan male actors
Makerere University alumni
People educated at Busoga College